Ris may refer to the following:
 Ris, Puy-de-Dôme, a commune in France
 Ris, Hautes-Pyrénées, a commune in France
 Ris, Norway
 Diane Ris (1932–2013), Catholic nun, educator and author
 Friedrich Ris (1867–1931), Swiss physician and entomologist
 Sweetbread, a type of offal, ris in French

See also
 RIS (disambiguation)
 RI (disambiguation)